Xynisteri (also spelled xinisteri) is an indigenous white grape grown on Cyprus.

According to some estimates, 33% of Cypriot vineyards, on the south slopes of the Troodos mountain range are planted with this grape variety, a fact that makes Xynisteri the main white grape grown of Cyprus.

Its clusters and berries are of medium size while it is known for its durability against wine diseases. It is used in the production of several local (mainly white) wines. Xynisteri is blended with Mavro grapes for the production of the Commandaria, a well-known Cypriot dessert wine and it is also used for the production of the local spirit Zivania.

References

White wine grape varieties
Grape varieties of Cyprus
Dessert wine